Aris Aitoliko Football Club is a Greek football club, based in Aitoliko, Aetolia-Acarnania.

The club was founded in 1926. They will play in Football League 2 for the season 2013-14.

Honours

Domestic
 Aitolia-Acarnania Champions: 4
 1974–75, 1975–76, 1992–93, 1998–99
 Aitolia-Acarnania Cup Winners: 2
 1973–74, 1976–77

Football clubs in Western Greece
Association football clubs established in 1926
1926 establishments in Greece